The 2014 Colchester Borough Council election took place on 22 May 2014 to elect members of Colchester Borough Council in Essex, England. One third of the council was up for election and the council stayed under no overall control.

Background
Before the election a coalition between the 26 Liberal Democrats, 7 Labour and 3 independents ran the council, while the 23 Conservatives were in opposition. There were also one seat vacant after the death of the Labour councillor for Wivenhoe Quay Steve Ford.

20 seats were being contested, with the candidates including a full slate from the Green party and 13 from the UK Independence Party, more than the party had put forward at any previous local election in Colchester. 6 sitting councillors stood down at the election including the then mayor, Colin Sykes.

Election result
Only one seat changed hands at the election, with Labour's Chris Pearson gaining Berechurch from the Liberal Democrats. The Liberal Democrats held the other 9 seats they had been defending, holding Castle by 46 votes over the Conservatives and Old Heath (formerly Harbour ward) by 69 votes from Labour. The Conservatives gained an increased share of the vote at the election, but did not gain any more seats.

Meanwhile, the UK Independence Party picked up 16% of the vote, coming second in 9 wards, but failed to take any seats. This was despite the party topping the polls in Colchester with 35% at the European parliamentary election that was held at the same time as the council election, and coming closest to taking a seat in Tiptree where the Conservatives held the seat by 85 votes.

Following the election, councillor Laura Sykes left the Liberal Democrats and joined the Highwoods Independent group on the council (renamed to Highwoods & Stanway Independents), after a long-standing dispute with another Liberal Democrat councillor. The coalition between the Liberal Democrats, Labour and independents continued to run the council.

Ward results

Berechurch

Birch & Winstree

Castle

Christ Church

Fordham & Stour

Highwoods

Lexden

Mile End

New Town

Old Heath

Prior to the election, Old Heath was known as Harbour ward.

Prettygate

Pyefleet

St. Andrew's

St. Anne's

St. John's

Shrub End

Stanway

Tiptree

West Bergholt & Eight Ash Green

West Mersea

By-elections

Wivenhoe Quay

A by-election was held in Wivenhoe Quay on 3 July 2014 following the death of Labour councillor Steve Ford. The seat was held for Labour by Rosalind Scott with a majority of 228 votes over the Conservatives.

References

2014 English local elections
2014
2010s in Essex